Events from the year 1974 in Pakistan.

Incumbents

Federal government
President: Fazal Ilahi Chaudhry
Prime Minister: Zulfikar Ali Bhutto
Chief Justice: Hamoodur Rahman

Governors
Governor of Balochistan: Nawab Akbar Khan Bugti (until 2 January); Ahmad Yar Khan (starting 2 January)
Governor of Khyber Pakhtunkhwa: Aslam Khattak (until 24 May); Syed Ghawas (starting 24 May)
Governor of Punjab: Sadiq Hussain Qureshi
Governor of Sindh: Begum Ra'ana Liaquat Ali Khan

Events
 In 1974, the students of Nishtar Medical College had altercation with the Ahmadis in the Rabwah Railway Station. This event turned into a massive and violent anti-Ahmadiyya   movement resulting in many casualties of Ahmadis and destruction to Ahmadiyya property.
 Three years after the secession of East Pakistan, Pakistan recognised Bangladesh.

See also
 1973 in Pakistan
 Other events of 1974
 1974 Anti-Ahmadiyya Movement
 1975 in Pakistan
 List of Pakistani films of 1974
 Timeline of Pakistani history

References

 
Persecution of Ahmadis in Pakistan
1974 in Asia